The Tomnahurich Cemetery is a Victorian cemetery in Inverness, Scotland.

Etymology 
Tomnaurich is a Scottish gaelic term which can be translated as "hill of the fairies" or "hill of the yew trees".

Features 
The cemetery is located on a low but very prominent hill 1.5 km SW of the city centre, between the Caledonian Canal and the River Ness. The hilltop is at 70 m, and its topographic prominence is 53 m.
The cemetery consists in two areas: a formal graveyard on the upper plateau, which also hosts a war memorial, and the Lower Cemetery, occupying the low ground around the hill. Some footpaths connect these two burial areas. The hillside is covered in woodland and provides a convenient habitat to several bird species. The hilltop offers a wide panorama on Inverness city, the Moray Firth  and on the Ness Valley. The Tomahurich itself, as seen from the surrounding plain, is an important landmark.

History

Before its use as a cemetery the hill, due to its prominent location, hosted various social events such as an annual horse race, which used to take place around the hill on the 24–25th May. In 1753 the hill, which ground was considered too poor in quality for agriculture, was planted with trees, mainly Pinus sylvestris. The views offered from the hilltop were praised by artists and scientists. For instance Thomas Pennant climbed the Tomnahurich in the XVIII Century, reporting its name as Tommin heurich.
In the second half of the XIX century the Inverness Cemetery Company, a joint-stock company, developed the present-day cemetery and opened it in 1864. Although its design is attributed to Charles Heath Wilson, a great deal of the work was done by George Grant Mackay, a Scottish civil engineer. The cemetery gradually expanded also around the hill, and in 1909 it was acquired by the Borough of Inverness. During the Second World War lots of metallic chains and iron parts were removed from the cemetery, in order to contribute in the national war effort.

Artworks 

Many tombstones and structures of the cemetery are of historic and architectural interest. Among them can be remembered the memorial monument to Mary Anne Lyall, of Andrew Davidson's (1841–1925), or the mausoleum of Henry Christie, with an armed angel statue guarding its marble door. Close to the main entrance stands a lodge designed by Alexander Ross in 1877.

See also
 Glasgow Necropolis
 Inventory of Gardens and Designed Landscapes in Scotland

References

External links
  Commonwealth War Graves Commission
 Tomnahurich Cemetery, Find A Grave

Cemeteries in Scotland
Buildings and structures in Inverness
Inventory of Gardens and Designed Landscapes
Commonwealth War Graves Commission cemeteries in Scotland
1864 establishments in Scotland
Necropoleis